This is a list of French cheeses documenting the varieties of cheeses, a milk-based food that is produced in wide-ranging flavors, textures, and forms, which are found in France. In 1962, French President Charles de Gaulle asked, "How can you govern a country which has two hundred and forty-six varieties of cheese?" There is immense diversity within each variety of cheese, leading some to estimate between 1,000 and 1,600 distinct types of French cheese. French cheeses are broadly grouped into eight categories, 'les huit familles de fromage'.

Protected designation of origin
Under the Common Agricultural Policy of the European Union, certain established cheeses, including many French varieties, are covered by a protected designation of origin (PDO), and other, less stringent, designations of geographical origin for traditional specialities, such as the EU Protected Geographical Indication (PGI). The systems has largely replaced national systems, such as the French appellation d'origine contrôlée (AOC) system, as any cheese registered as a PDO or PGI can not use the designation AOC anymore in order to avoid confusion.

French cheese production is classified under four categories, and PDO/PGI/(AOC) rules dictate which category or categories each protected cheese may be assigned to:

 Fermier: farmhouse cheese, which is produced on the farm where the milk is produced.
 Artisanal: producer producing cheese in relatively small quantities using milk from their own farm, but may also purchase milk from local farms.
 Coopérative: dairy with local milk producers in an area that have joined to produce cheese. In larger coopératives quantities of cheese produced may be relatively large, akin to some industriel producers (many may be classed as factory-made).
Industriel: factory-made cheese from milk sourced locally or regionally, perhaps all over France (depending on the AOC/PDO regulations for specific cheeses).

Some cheeses are classified, protected, and regulated under French law. The majority are classified as Appellation d'origine contrôlée (AOC), the highest level of protection. Some are also protected under the less stringent but still legally regulated designation Label Régional (LR). A few French cheeses are protected under the European Union's Protected Geographic Indication designation (PGI). Many familiar generic types, like Boursin, are not covered, while others originally from other countries, such as Emmental cheese, may have certain varieties protected as a French cheese. This list differs from those of AOC status.

Other  cheeses

 Abbaye de Belloc
 Abbaye de Tamié
 Abbaye de Timadeuc Cheese
 Affidélice
 Autun
 Avalin
 Babybel
 Baguette laonnaise
 Bilou
 Bleu de Bresse
 Bleu de Termignon
 Bon Grivois
 Boulette d'Avesnes
 Boursin cheese
 Brie Noir (Black Brie)
 Brillat-Savarin
 Broccio Passu
 Bucheron
 Cabécou
 Cabrinu
 Cabriou
 Cachaille
 Cacouyard
 Callebasse
 Cancoillotte
 Canut
 Carré de l'Est
 Cathare
 Chamois d'or
 Chaource
 Chatou
 Chaubier
 Chaumes
 Coulommiers
 Coutances
 Délice de Bourgogne
 Délice du Calvados
 Doux de Montagne
 Ecorce de sapin
 Édel de Cléron
 Epenouse
 Explorateur
 Faisselle
 Fédou
 Feuille de Dreux
 Feuille du Limousin
 Ficello
 Figou
 Fromage blanc
 Fromage frais 
 Fromager d'Affinois
 Fougerus
 Foudjou
 Fourme d’Asco
 Fourme de Cantal
 Gaperon
 La Vache qui Rit
 Lavort
 Mamirollais
 Mamirolle
 Metton
 Mont des Cats
 
 Mousseron
 Niolo
 Olivet cendré
 Ortolan
 Pavin
 Perail
 Pérassu
 Port Salut
 Raclette
 Rochebarron
 Roucoulons
 Roue de Brielove
 Saint Agur
 Saint Albray
 Saint-André
 Saint-Paulin
 Saint-Rémy
 Spinosien
 Tarentais
 Tomme au Fenouil
 Tomme Boudane
 Tomme Butone
 Tomme de Lévéjac
 Tomme du Jura
 Tomme du Revard
 Toucy
 Tourrée de l'aubier
 Tracle
 Trèfle
 Tricorne de Marans
 Trinqueux
 U Muntagnolu
 Vallé d'Ossau
 Velay
 Venaco
 Vesontio
 Vieux-Boulogne
 Vieux Samer
 Void
 Xaintray

See also

 List of cheeses
 List of cheesemakers

Notes

External links

 Pictures Gallery of French Cheese (and some others)
 Pictures and detailed information on French Cheese 

 
French
Cheese
+FranceList_of_French_cheeses